アーロン may refer to:

Aaron (given name)
Auron (Final Fantasy), a character in the video game Final Fantasy X
Arlong, a character in the manga series One Piece